
Gruszeczka  is a village in the administrative district of Gmina Milicz, within Milicz County, Lower Silesian Voivodeship, in south-western Poland.

World War II
Gruszeczka was the location of Birnbäumel Concentration Camp with around 1,000 women prisoners working for Nazi German company Unternehmen Barthold. Birnbäumel was a subcamp of Gross-Rosen concentration camp complex, with the majority of inmates, both Christian and Jewish, deported from across occupied Poland.

References

Gruszeczka
 List
Holocaust locations in Poland